Steytler Thwaits (27 November 1911 – 13 October 1980) was a South African cricketer. He played in 41 first-class matches between 1939/40 and 1954/55.

See also
 List of Eastern Province representative cricketers

References

External links
 

1911 births
1980 deaths
South African cricketers
Eastern Province cricketers
Western Province cricketers
Cricketers from Cape Town